Bob Anderson (born 1943) is an American wrestler and coach. Anderson was born in 1943 in Oakland, California and is from Redondo Beach, California. He attended South High School (Torrance, California), where he placed 3rd his junior year, and finished as a state champion his senior year. He won the 1968 Western Regional Olympic Trials and went on to win the 1968 Olympic trials. Anderson attended El Camino College, where he won states as a sophomore had a record-breaking 1 loss the whole season. Anderson ended up transferring to Adams State College; he then became a 2-time NAIA champion, and was Rocky Mountain Champion.Anderson was an NCAA All-American. Anderson competed and won in the 1968 Olympic Trials in Greco-Roman style and was alternate on the 1968 Olympic team. He also wrestled freestyle. He wrestled Greco-Roman in the 1971 Pan American Games, and in Sambo style in August 1979 at the 1979 Pan American Team Championships in San Diego. He coached and competed in the Pan American Games in 1978, earning an individual and a coaching championship. Anderson coached 2 national teams in Sambo, placing 2nd and 3rd. In 1996  Anderson had trained Rolls Gracie, whom he would teach techniques like the Americana Arm Bar. He was a 1996 US Olympic Team wrestling coach. In 2003, he became the World Masters Wrestling Champion at 211 lbs. Anderson has also trained Rulon Gardner, Dan Henderson, Heath Sims, and Randy Couture.

Early life 
In high school, Anderson attended South High
School in Torrance, California, where he placed 3rd his junior year and went on to become a
state champion his senior year of high school.

College 
In college, Anderson attended El Camino College, where he won state
his sophomore year and had a record-breaking 1 loss all season. After winning
state Anderson transferred to Adam St. College. He was a 2-time NAIA champion and
also was chosen as a division 1 All-American.

Freestyle wrestling 
In 1968, Anderson began his freestyle wrestling career when he won
the western regional Olympic trials in Greco-Roman. In 1971 he went on to place 2nd
at the Greco-Roman world team trials. Anderson last competed in
the 1979 Pan American games, once again placing 2nd. Although Anderson
never became a world champion at the senior level, he said that he had no regrets, and his accomplishments were well worth it.

Coaching career 
Shortly after his fall in the world championships, he became
a coach. He coached his first competition in Mexico City leading his Olympic team
to a world championship. 1978, Anderson traveled to Brazil, also leading 2 national
teams to victory in the Sambo tournament. 1984 Anderson was not as successful but was
an assistant coach for a 3rd-placing national wrestling team in the Olympics
held in Rome; this would be his last coaching event. In 2003, Anderson was a master world champion at 211 lbs. He is a longtime champion, coach, and mentor. Every other year Anderson hosts a camp for wrestlers.

References

American male sport wrestlers
American sambo practitioners
Living people
Adams State Grizzlies wrestlers
El Camino Warriors wrestlers
American wrestling coaches
1944 births
Sportspeople from Oakland, California
Sportspeople from Redondo Beach, California
Pan American Games silver medalists for the United States
Pan American Games medalists in wrestling
Wrestlers at the 1971 Pan American Games
Medalists at the 1971 Pan American Games